Steven Andrew Miller (born September 30, 1957) was the eleventh bishop of Milwaukee.

Biography
Miller was born in Detroit, Michigan, on September 30, 1957. He studied at Michigan State University, graduating in 1979 with a Bachelor of Arts, and then at the General Theological Seminary, graduating in 1984 with a Master of Divinity.

He was ordained deacon and priest in 1984, and served as curate at Christ Church in St. Joseph, Missouri. In 1986 he became vicar of Christ Church in Boonville, Missouri, and St Mary's Church in Fayette, Missouri. Subsequently, he also served as chaplain at the residential alcohol and drug treatment center. In 1990, he became rector of Christ Church in Gordonsville, Virginia, and in 1996 rector of St Alban's Church in Annandale, Virginia. He also served as regional dean in the Diocese of Virginia and as president of the diocesan Standing Committee.

On the third ballot, Miller was elected the eleventh bishop of the Diocese of Milwaukee on May 31, 2003, and was consecrated on October 18, 2003, at the Mater Christi Chapel of the Archbishop Cousins Catholic Center in Milwaukee.

See also
 List of Episcopal bishops of the United States
 Historical list of the Episcopal bishops of the United States

References

1957 births
Living people
Michigan State University alumni
General Theological Seminary alumni
Clergy from Detroit
21st-century Anglican bishops in the United States
Episcopal bishops of Milwaukee